The Baltimore Crew was an Italian American organized crime group that ultimately became a faction of the Gambino crime family operating in the port city of Baltimore, Maryland from about 1900 until the 1990s. It was originally an independent organization led by the D'Urso family until the Corbi takeover in the 1920s. In 1955, Vincent Mangano of the New York-based Gambino family moved in and installed Louis Morici as the reigning caporegime over the area. The Corbi family acquiesced to the Gambino relationship, but maintained local leadership, simply answering to and accessing support from Morici and his New York Gambino connections. Throughout most of its existence, after 1920, "The Baltimore Cosca" was functionally headed by the Corbi family: Vito, and then his sons, Pasquale "Patsy" and Frank.

History

Rule of the Corbi brothers
In the spring of 1923, Patsy Corbi was sentenced to life imprisonment for the murder of local barber Frank Naples, a reputed Camorra member. Antonio "Tony" Corbi went into hiding in 1923, and reportedly traveled to Mexico and Italy, attempting to evade charges for the murder of Belle Lemons.  He did not resurface publicly until the 1930s in Youngstown Ohio where he ran the Yo Hio Social Club.

Under Gambino leadership
In 1966, Lou Morici stepped down from the role of capo due to ill health. During this time, the crew was put under the management of the then-capo Joseph N. Gallo. Frank Corbi assumed the position of acting leader of the Baltimore operation, reporting directly to Gallo. Eventually, Corbi was promoted to official captain of the outfit.

By the 1980s most of the membership had died or retired, and with Corbi in his 80s and inactive, the regime became extinct.

Historical Leadership

Historical Membership
Vincent Coronna
Frank Dabenne
Thomas "Reds" Aversa
Benjamin "Benny Trotta" Magliano

Historical Associates
 Joseph Nunzio Corbi (1911-2001)
 Joseph Tamburello (1906-1983)
 August "Nick Trotta" Magliano (1917-1998),
 Angelo Munafo (1927-2001)
 Mario Orazio Anello (1905-1972)
 Joseph Gigliotti (1903-2001)
 Frank Malvaso (1904?-1991?)
 Angelo Perrera (1912-1972)

See also
History of the Italians in Baltimore

References

Gambino crime family
Former gangs in Baltimore
Italian-American culture in Baltimore
American Mafia crews